Cape Verde or Cabo Verde, officially the Republic of Cabo Verde, is an archipelago and island country in the central Atlantic Ocean, consisting of ten volcanic islands with a combined land area of about . The Cape Verde islands form part of the Macaronesia ecoregion, along with the Azores, the Canary Islands, Madeira, and the Savage Isles.

The Cape Verde archipelago was uninhabited until the 15th century, when Portuguese explorers discovered and colonized the islands, thus establishing the first European settlement in the tropics. Because the Cape Verde islands were located in a convenient location to play a role in the Atlantic slave trade, Cape Verde became economically prosperous during the 16th and 17th centuries, attracting merchants, privateers, and pirates. It declined economically in the 19th century after the suppression of the Atlantic slave trade, and many of its inhabitants emigrated during that period. However, Cape Verde gradually recovered economically by becoming an important commercial center and useful stopover point along major shipping routes. In 1951, Cape Verde was incorporated as an overseas department of Portugal, but its inhabitants continued to campaign for independence, which they achieved in 1975.

Since the early 1990s, Cape Verde has been a stable representative democracy and has remained one of the most developed and democratic countries in Africa. Lacking natural resources, its developing economy is mostly service-oriented, with a growing focus on tourism and foreign investment. Its population of around 483,628 is mostly of mixed African and European heritage, and predominantly Roman Catholic, reflecting the legacy of Portuguese rule. A sizeable Cape Verdean diaspora community exists across the world, especially in the United States and Portugal, considerably outnumbering the inhabitants on the islands. Cape Verde is a member state of the African Union.

Cape Verde's official language is Portuguese.  It is the language of instruction and government. It is also used in newspapers, television, and radio. The recognized national language is Cape Verdean Creole, which is spoken by the vast majority of the population.

As of the 2021 census the most populated islands were Santiago where the capital Praia is located (269.370), São Vicente (74.016), Santo Antão (36.632), Fogo (33.519) and Sal (33.347). The biggest cities are Praia (137.868), Mindelo (69.013), Espargos (24.500) and Assomada (21.297).

Etymology 
The country is named after the Cap-Vert peninsula, on the Senegalese coast. The name Cap-Vert, in turn, comes from the Portuguese language  ('green cape'), the name that Portuguese explorers gave the cape in 1444, a few years before they came across the islands.

On 24 October 2013, the country's delegation to the United Nations informed it that other countries should no longer use Cape Verde or any other translations of Cabo Verde as part of its official name: all countries should use Republic of Cabo Verde as the country's official name. Speakers of English have used the name Cape Verde for the archipelago and, since independence in 1975, for the country. In 2013, the Cape Verdean government determined that it would thenceforth use the Portuguese name  for official purposes, including at the United Nations, even when speaking or writing in English.

History 

The archipelago of modern-day Cape Verde was formed approximately 40–50 million years ago during the Eocene era.

Before the arrival of Europeans, the Cape Verde Islands were uninhabited. They were discovered by Genoese and Portuguese navigators around 1456. According to Portuguese official records, the first discoveries were made by Genoa-born António de Noli, who was afterwards appointed governor of Cape Verde by the Portuguese king Afonso V. Other navigators mentioned as contributing to discoveries on the Cape Verde archipelago are Diogo Dias, Diogo Afonso, Venetian Alvise Cadamosto, and Diogo Gomes (who had accompanied António de Noli on his voyage of discovery, and who claimed to have been the first to land on the Cape Verdean island of Santiago, and the first to name that island).

In 1462, Portuguese settlers arrived at Santiago and founded a settlement they called Ribeira Grande. Today it is called Cidade Velha ("Old City"), to distinguish it from a town of the same name on a different Cape Verdean island (Ribeira Grande on the island of Santo Antão). The original Ribeira Grande was the first permanent European settlement in the tropics.

In the 16th century, the archipelago prospered from the Atlantic slave trade. Pirates occasionally attacked the Portuguese settlements. Francis Drake, an English privateer, twice sacked the (then) capital Ribeira Grande in 1585 when it was a part of the Iberian Union. After a French attack in 1712, the town declined in importance relative to nearby Praia, which became the capital in 1770.

The decline in the slave trade in the 19th century resulted in an economic crisis. Cape Verde's early prosperity slowly vanished. However, the islands' position astride mid-Atlantic shipping lanes made Cape Verde an ideal location for re-supplying ships. Because of its excellent harbour, the city of Mindelo, located on the island of São Vicente, became an important commercial centre during the 19th century. Diplomat Edmund Roberts visited Cape Verde in 1832.

With few natural resources and inadequate sustainable investment from the Portuguese, the citizens grew increasingly discontented with the colonial masters, who refused to provide the local authorities with more autonomy. In 1951, Portugal changed Cape Verde's status from a colony to an overseas province in an attempt to blunt growing nationalism.

In 1956, Amílcar Cabral and a group of fellow Cape Verdeans and Guineans organized (in Portuguese Guinea) the clandestine African Party for the Independence of Guinea and Cape Verde (PAIGC). It demanded improvement in economic, social and political conditions in Cape Verde and Portuguese Guinea and formed the basis of the two nations' independence movement. Moving its headquarters to Conakry, Guinea in 1960, the PAIGC began an armed rebellion against Portugal in 1961. Acts of sabotage eventually grew into a war in Portuguese Guinea that pitted 10,000 Soviet Bloc-supported PAIGC soldiers against 35,000 Portuguese and African troops.

By 1972, the PAIGC controlled much of Portuguese Guinea despite the presence of the Portuguese troops, but the organization did not attempt to disrupt Portuguese control in Cape Verde. Portuguese Guinea declared independence in 1973 and was granted de jure independence in 1974. A budding independence movement – originally led by Amílcar Cabral, assassinated in 1973 – passed on to his half-brother Luís Cabral and culminated in independence for the archipelago in 1975.

Independence (1975) 

Following the April 1974 revolution in Portugal, the PAIGC became an active political movement in Cape Verde. In December 1974, the PAIGC and Portugal signed an agreement providing for a transitional government composed of Portuguese and Cape Verdeans. On 30 June 1975, Cape Verdeans elected a National Assembly which received the instruments of independence from Portugal on 5 July 1975. In the late 1970s and 1980s, most African countries prohibited South African Airways from overflights but Cape Verde allowed them and became a centre of activity for the airline's flights to Europe and the United States.

Immediately following the November 1980 coup in Guinea-Bissau, relations between Cape Verde and Guinea-Bissau became strained. Cape Verde abandoned its hope for unity with Guinea-Bissau and formed the African Party for the Independence of Cape Verde (PAICV). Problems have since been resolved and relations between the countries are good. The PAICV and its predecessor established a one-party system and ruled Cape Verde from independence until 1990.

Responding to growing pressure for pluralistic democracy, the PAICV called an emergency congress in February 1990 to discuss proposed constitutional changes to end one-party rule. Opposition groups came together to form the Movement for Democracy (MpD) in Praia in April 1990. Together, they campaigned for the right to contest the presidential election scheduled for December 1990.

The one-party state was abolished on 28 September 1990, and the first multi-party elections were held in January 1991. The MpD won a majority of the seats in the National Assembly, and MpD presidential candidate António Mascarenhas Monteiro defeated the PAICV's candidate with 73.5% of the votes. Legislative elections in December 1995 increased the MpD majority in the National Assembly. The party won 50 of the National Assembly's 72 seats.

A February 1996 presidential election returned President Monteiro to office. Legislative elections in January 2001 returned power to the PAICV, with the PAICV holding 40 of the National Assembly seats, MpD 30, and Party for Democratic Convergence (PCD) and Labour and Solidarity Party (PTS) 1 each. In February 2001, the PAICV-supported presidential candidate Pedro Pires defeated former MpD leader Carlos Veiga by only 13 votes.
President Pedro Pires was narrowly re-elected in 2006 elections.

President Jorge Carlos Fonseca led the country since 2011 Cape Verde presidential election and he was re-elected in the 2016 election. He was supported by the Movement for Democracy Party. MpD also won in the 2016 parliamentary elections, taking back parliamentary majority after 15 year-rule of African Party for the Independence of Cape Verde (PAICV). In April 2021, the ruling center-right Movement for Democracy (MpD) of Prime Minister Ulisses Correia e Silva won the parliamentary election.

On 26 August 2021, Cape Verde became the 150th country to ratify the 2005 Convention and Promotion of the Diversity of Cultural Expressions.

In October 2021, opposition candidate and former prime minister, Jose Maria Neves of PAICV, won Cape Verde's presidential election. On 9 November 2021, Jose Maria Neves was sworn in as the new President of Cape Verde.

Government and politics 

Cape Verde is a stable semi-presidential representative democratic republic. It is among the most democratic nations in Africa, ranking 26th in the world, according to the 2018 Democracy Index. The constitution – adopted in 1980 and revised in 1992, 1995 and 1999 – defines the basic principles of its government. The president is the head of state and is elected by popular vote for a five-year term.

The prime minister is the head of government and proposes other ministers and secretaries of state. The prime minister is nominated by the National Assembly and appointed by the president. Members of the National Assembly are elected by popular vote for five-year terms. In 2016, three parties held seats in the National Assembly – MpD (36), PAICV (25), and the Cape Verdean Independent Democratic Union (UCID) (3).

The two main political parties are PAICV and MpD.

Movement for Democracy (MpD) ousted the ruling African Party for the Independence of Cape Verde (PAICV) for the first time in 15 years in the 2016 parliamentary election, at which time its leader, Ulisses Correia e Silva, became prime minister. Jorge Carlos Almeida Fonseca was elected president in August 2011 and re-elected in October 2016. He is also supported by the MpD.

In November 2021, Cape Verde opened its first embassy in Nigeria.

International recognition 
Cape Verde is often praised as an example among African nations for its stability and developmental growth despite its lack of natural resources. In 2013 then United States President Barack Obama said Cape Verde is "a real success story". Among other achievements, it has been recognized with the following assessments:

Foreign relations 

Cape Verde follows a policy of nonalignment and seeks cooperative relations with all friendly states. Angola, Brazil, China, Libya, Cuba, France, Guinea-Bissau, Germany, Italy, Portugal, Spain, São Tomé and Príncipe, Senegal, Russia, Luxembourg, and the United States maintain embassies in Praia. Cape Verde maintains a vigorously active foreign policy, especially in Africa.

Cape Verde is a founding member state of the Community of Portuguese Language Countries (CPLP), also known as the Lusophone Commonwealth, an international organization and political association of Lusophone nations across four continents, where Portuguese is an official language.

Cape Verde has bilateral relations with some Lusophone nations and holds membership in a number of international organizations. It also participates in most international conferences on economic and political issues. Since 2007, Cape Verde has a special partnership status with the EU, under the Cotonou Agreement, and might apply for special membership, in particular because the Cape Verdean escudo, the country's currency, is indexed to the euro. In 2011 Cape Verde ratified the Rome Statute of the International Criminal Court. In 2017 Cape Verde signed the UN treaty on the Prohibition of Nuclear Weapons.

Judiciary 
The judicial system consists of a Supreme Court of Justice – whose members are appointed by the president, the National Assembly, and the Board of the Judiciary – and regional courts. Separate courts hear civil, constitutional, and criminal cases. Appeals are to the Supreme Court.

Military 

The military of Cape Verde consists of the National Guard and the Coast Guard; 0.7% of the country's GDP was spent on the military in 2005.

Having fought their only battles in the war for independence against Portugal between 1974 and 1975, the efforts of the Cape Verdean armed forces have turned to combating international drug trafficking. In 2007, together with the Cape Verdean Police, they carried out Operation Flying Launch, a successful operation to put an end to a drug trafficking group which smuggled cocaine from Colombia to the Netherlands and Germany using the country as a reorder point. The operation took more than three years, being a secret operation during the first two years, and ended in 2010. In 2016, Cape Verdean Armed Forces were involved in the Monte Tchota massacre, a green-on-green incident that resulted in 11 deaths.

Although located in Africa, Cape Verde has always had close relations with Europe. Because of this, some scholars argue that Cape Verde may be eligible to join the Organization for Security and Co-operation in Europe (OSCE) and NATO.

Geography 

It lies between latitudes 14° and 18°N, and longitudes 22° and 26°W.

The country is a horseshoe-shaped cluster of ten islands (nine inhabited) and eight islets, that constitute an area of 4033 km2 (1557 sq mi).

The islands are spatially divided into two groups:
 The Barlavento Islands (windward islands): Santo Antão, São Vicente, Santa Luzia, São Nicolau, Sal, Boa Vista; and
 The Sotavento Islands (leeward): Maio, Santiago, Fogo, Brava.
The largest island, both in size and population, is Santiago, which hosts the nation's capital, Praia, the principal urban agglomeration in the archipelago.

Three of the Cape Verde islands, Sal, Boa Vista, and Maio, are fairly flat, sandy, and dry; the others are generally rockier with more vegetation.

Physical geography and geology 

The volcanic and plutonic rocks are distinctly basic; the archipelago is a soda-alkaline petrographic province, with a petrologic succession similar to that found in other Macaronesian islands.

Magnetic anomalies identified in the vicinity of the archipelago indicate that the structures forming the islands date back 125–150 million years: the islands themselves date from 8 million (in the west) to 20 million years (in the east). The oldest exposed rocks occurred on Maio and the northern peninsula of Santiago and are 128–131 million-year-old pillow lavas. The first stage of volcanism in the islands began in the early Miocene, and reached its peak at the end of this period when the islands reached their maximum sizes. Historical volcanism (within human settlement) has been restricted to the island of Fogo.

The islands lie on a bathymetric swell known as the Cape Verde Rise. The Rise is one of the largest protuberances in the world's oceans, rising  in a semi-circular region of 1200 km2 (460 sq mi), associated with a rise of the geoid.

Pico do Fogo, the largest active volcano in the region, erupted in 2014. The caldera resulted from subsidence, following the partial evacuation (eruption) of the magma chamber, along a cylindrical column from within the magma chamber (at a depth of ).

Extensive salt flats are found on Sal and Maio. On Santiago, Santo Antão, and São Nicolau, arid slopes give way in places to sugarcane fields or banana plantations spread along the base of towering mountains. Ocean cliffs have been formed by catastrophic debris landslides.

According to the president of Nauru, in 2011 Cape Verde was ranked the eighth most endangered nation due to flooding from climate change.

Climate 

Cape Verde's climate is milder than that of the African mainland because the surrounding sea moderates temperatures on the islands and cold Atlantic currents produce an arid atmosphere around the archipelago. Conversely, the islands do not receive the upwelling (cold streams) that affect the West African coast, so the air temperature is cooler than in Senegal, but the sea is warmer. Due to the relief of some islands, such as Santiago with its steep mountains, the islands can have orographically induced precipitation, allowing rich woods and luxuriant vegetation to grow where the humid air condenses soaking the plants, rocks, soil, logs, moss, etc. On the higher islands and somewhat wetter islands, exclusively in mountainous areas, like Santo Antão island, the climate is suitable for the development of dry monsoon forests, and laurel forests. Cape Verde is part of the Sahelian arid belt, with nothing like the rainfall levels of nearby West Africa. It rains irregularly between August and October, with frequent brief heavy downpours. Sal's total of  confirms this classification. Most of the year's rain falls in September.

Sal, Boa Vista, and Maio have a flat landscape and arid climate, whilst the other islands are generally rockier and have more vegetation. Because of the infrequent occurrence of rainfall, where not mountainous, the landscape is so arid that less than two percent of it is arable. Most rainfall precipitation is due to condensation of the ocean mist.

In some islands, like Santiago, the wetter climate of the interior and the eastern coast contrasts with the drier one on the south/southwest coast. Praia, on the southeast coast, is the largest city on the island and the largest city and capital of the country.

While most of Cape Verde receives little precipitation throughout the year, the northeastern slopes of high mountains see significant rainfall due to orographic lift, especially in areas far from the sea. In some such areas this precipitation is sufficient to support a rainforest habitat, albeit one significantly affected by the islands' human presence. These umbria areas are identified as cool and moist. Cape Verde lies in the Cape Verde Islands dry forests ecoregion.

Western Hemisphere-bound hurricanes often have their early beginnings near the Cape Verde Islands. These are referred to as Cape Verde-type hurricanes. These hurricanes can become very intense as they cross warm Atlantic waters away from Cape Verde. The average hurricane season has about two Cape Verde-type hurricanes, which are usually the largest and most intense storms of the season because they often have plenty of warm open ocean over which to develop before encountering land. The five largest Atlantic tropical cyclones on record have been Cape Verde-type hurricanes. Most of the longest-lived tropical cyclones in the Atlantic basin are Cape Verde hurricanes.

As of 2015, the islands themselves have only been struck by hurricanes twice in recorded history (since 1851): once in 1892, and again in 2015 by Hurricane Fred, the easternmost hurricane ever to form in the Atlantic.

Biodiversity 

Cape Verde's isolation has resulted in the islands having several endemic species, particularly birds and reptiles, many of which are endangered by human development. Endemic birds include Alexander's swift (Apus alexandri), Bourne's heron (Ardea purpurea bournei), the Raso lark (Alauda razae), the Cape Verde warbler (Acrocephalus brevipennis), and the Iago sparrow (Passer iagoensis). The islands are also an important breeding area for seabirds including the Cape Verde shearwater. Reptiles include the Cape Verde giant gecko (Tarentola gigas).

Administrative divisions 

Cape Verde is divided into 22 municipalities and subdivided into 32 parishes (freguesias), based on the religious parishes that existed during the colonial period:

Economy 

Cape Verde's notable economic growth and improvement in living conditions despite a lack of natural resources have garnered international recognition, with other countries and international organizations often providing development aid. Since 2007, the UN has classified it as a developing nation rather than a least developed country.

Cape Verde has few natural resources. Only five of the ten main islands (Santiago, Santo Antão, São Nicolau, Fogo, and Brava) normally support significant agricultural production, and over 90% of all food consumed in Cape Verde is imported. Mineral resources include salt, pozzolana (a volcanic rock used in cement production), and limestone. Its small number of wineries making Portuguese-style wines have traditionally focused on the domestic market, but have recently met with some international acclaim. Several wine tours of Cape Verde's various microclimates began to be offered in spring 2010.

The economy of Cape Verde is service-oriented, with commerce, transport, and public services accounting for more than 70% of GDP. Although nearly 35% of the population lives in rural areas, agriculture and fishing contribute only about 9% of GDP. Light manufacturing accounts for most of the remainder. Fish and shellfish are plentiful, and small quantities are exported. Cape Verde has cold storage and freezing facilities and fish processing plants in Mindelo, Praia, and on Sal. Expatriate Cape Verdeans contribute an amount estimated at 20% of GDP to the domestic economy through remittances.
Despite having few natural resources and being semi-desert, the country boasts the highest living standards in the region and has attracted thousands of immigrants of different nationalities.

Since 1991, the government has pursued market-oriented economic policies, including an open welcome to foreign investors and a far-reaching privatization programme. It established as top development priorities the promotion of a market economy and the private sector; the development of tourism, light manufacturing industries, and fisheries; and the development of transport, communications, and energy facilities. From 1994 to 2000 about $407 million in foreign investments were made or planned, of which 58% were in tourism, 17% in industry, 4% in infrastructure, and 21% in fisheries and services.

In 2011, on four islands a wind farm was built that supplies about 30% of the electricity of the country.
As host to the ECOWAS Regional Centre for Renewable Energy and Energy Efficiency, inaugurated in 2010, Cape Verde plans to lead by example by becoming entirely reliant on renewable energy sources by 2025. This policy is consistent with the plethora of documents adopted in 2015 paving the way to more sustainable development, including Cape Verde's Transformational Agenda to 2030, its National Renewable Energy Plan and its Low Carbon and Climate-resilient Development Strategy. Two years later, these were followed by a Strategic Plan for Sustainable Development, 2017–2021.

Between 2000 and 2009, real GDP increased on average by over seven percent a year, well above the average for Sub-Saharan countries and faster than most small island economies in the region. Strong economic performance was bolstered by one of the fastest growing tourism industries in the world, as well as by substantial capital inflows that allowed Cape Verde to build up national currency reserves to the current 3.5 months of imports. Unemployment has been falling rapidly, and the country is on track to achieve most of the UN Millennium Development Goals – including halving its 1990 poverty level.

In 2007, Cape Verde joined the World Trade Organization (WTO) and in 2008 the country graduated from Least Developed Country (LDC) to Middle Income Country (MIC) status.

Cape Verde has significant cooperation with Portugal at every level of the economy, which has led it to link its currency first to the Portuguese escudo and, in 1999, to the euro. On 23 June 2008 Cape Verde became the 153rd member of the WTO.

In early January 2018, the government announced that the minimum wage would be raised to 13,000 CVE (US$140 or EUR 130) per month, from 11,000 CVE, which was effective in mid-January 2018.

Development 
The European Commission's total allocation for the period of 2008–2013 foreseen for Cape Verde to address "poverty reduction, in particular in rural and peri-urban areas where women are heading the households, as well as good governance" amounts to €54.1 million.

Tourism 

Cape Verde's strategic location at the crossroads of mid-Atlantic air and sea lanes has been enhanced by significant improvements at Mindelo's harbour (Porto Grande) and at Sal's and Praia's international airports. A new international airport was opened in Boa Vista in December 2007 and on the island of São Vicente, the newest international airport (Cesária Évora Airport) in Cape Verde was opened in late 2009. Ship repair facilities at Mindelo were opened in 1983.

The major ports are Mindelo and Praia, but all other islands have smaller port facilities. In addition to the international airport on Sal, airports have been built on all of the inhabited islands. All but the airports on Brava and Santo Antão enjoy scheduled air service.

The country's future economic prospects depend heavily on the maintenance of aid flows, the encouragement of tourism, remittances, outsourcing labour to neighbouring African countries, and the momentum of the government's development programme.

Demographics 

The official Census recorded that Cape Verde had a population of 512,096 in 2013. A large proportion (236,000) of Cape Verdeans live on the main island, Santiago.

Cape Verdeans are descendants of Africans (free or slaves) and Europeans of various origins. There are also Cape Verdeans who have Jewish ancestors from North Africa, mainly on the islands of Boa Vista, Santiago and Santo Antão. A large part of Cape Verdeans emigrated abroad, mainly to the United States, Portugal and France, so that there are more Cape Verdeans residing abroad than at home.

Unlike countries on the African continent, there are no tribes in Cape Verde. On the other hand, the country's historical trajectory included, from the beginning, a process of social class formation. At this moment, the absence of a "bourgeoisie" can be seen, but the existence of several types of "petty bourgeoisie", numerically significant. The majority of the population is, however, made up of the peasantry and some working class.

Languages 
Cape Verde's official language is Portuguese. It is the language of instruction and government. It is also used in newspapers, television, and radio.

Cape Verdean Creole is used colloquially throughout Cape Verde and is the mother tongue of virtually all Cape Verdeans. The national constitution calls for measures to give it parity with Portuguese. There is a substantial body of literature in Creole, especially in the Santiago Creole and the São Vicente Creole.  has been gaining prestige since the nation's independence from Portugal.

The differences between the forms of the language within the islands have been a major obstacle in the way of standardization of the language. Some people have advocated the development of two standards: a North (Barlavento) standard, centred on the São Vicente Creole, and a South (Sotavento) standard, centred on the Santiago Creole. Manuel Veiga, Ph.D., a linguist and Minister of Culture of Cape Verde, is the premier proponent of 's officialization and standardization.

Religion 

The vast majority of Cape Verdeans are Christian; reflecting centuries of Portuguese rule, Roman Catholics make up the single largest religious community, at just under 80 percent, as of 2010 (slightly down from 85 percent of the population in 2007). Most other religious groups are Protestant, with the evangelical Church of the Nazarene forming the second largest community; other sizeable denominations are the Seventh-day Adventist Church, the Assemblies of God, the Universal Church of the Kingdom of God and the Church of Jesus Christ of Latter-day Saints. Islam is the largest minority religion. Judaism had a historical presence during the colonial era. Atheists constitute less than 1 percent of the population. Many Cape Verdeans syncretize Christianity with indigenous African beliefs and customs.

Emigration and immigration 

Almost twice as many Cape Verdeans live abroad (nearly one million) than in the country itself. The islands have a long history of emigration and Cape Verdeans are highly dispersed worldwide, from Macau to Haiti and Argentina to Sweden. The diaspora may be much larger than official statistics indicate, as, until independence in 1975, Cape Verdean immigrants had Portuguese passports.

The majority of Cape Verdeans live in the United States and Western Europe, with the former hosting the largest overseas population at 500,000. Most Cape Verdeans in the U.S. are concentrated in New England, particularly the cities of Providence, New Bedford, and Boston; Brockton, Massachusetts, has the largest community of any American city (18,832). Cape Verdean immigrants have a long history of enlistment in the U.S. military, with a presence in every major conflict from the Revolutionary War to the Vietnam War.

Due to centuries of colonial ties, the second largest number of Cape Verdeans live in Portugal (150,000), with sizeable communities in the former Portuguese colonies of Angola (45,000) and São Tomé and Príncipe (25,000). Major populations exist in countries with cultural and linguistic similarities, such as Spain (65,500), France (25,000), Senegal (25,000), and Italy (20,000). Other large communities live in the United Kingdom (35,500), the Netherlands (20,000, of which 15,000 are concentrated in Rotterdam), and Luxembourg and Scandinavia (7,000). Outside the U.S. and Europe, the biggest Cape Verdean populations are in Mexico (5,000) and Argentina (8,000).

Over the years, Cape Verde has increasingly become a net recipient of migrants, due to its relatively high per capita income, political and social stability, and civil freedom. Chinese make up a sizeable and important segment of the foreign population, while nearby West African countries account for most immigration. In the 21st century, a few thousand Europeans and Latin Americans have settled in the country, mostly professionals, entrepreneurs, and retirees. Over 22,000 foreign-born residents are naturalized, hailing from over 90 countries.

The Cape Verdean diaspora experience is reflected in many artistic and cultural expressions, most famously the song Sodade by Cesária Évora.

Health 

The infant mortality rate among Cape Verdean children between 0 and 5 years old is 15 per 1,000 live births according to the latest (2017) data from the National Statistics Bureau, while the maternal mortality rate is 42 deaths per 100,000 live births. The HIV-AIDS prevalence rate among Cape Verdeans between 15 and 49 years old is 0.8%.

According to the latest data (2017) from the National Statistics Bureau, life expectancy at birth in Cape Verde is 76.2 years; that is, 72.2 years for males and 80.2 years for females. There are six hospitals in the Cape Verde archipelago: two central hospitals (one in the capital city of Praia and one in Mindelo, São Vicente) and four regional hospitals (one in Santa Catarina (northern Santiago region), one on São Antão, one on Fogo, and one on Sal). In addition, there are 28 health centers, 35 sanitation centers, and a variety of private clinics located throughout the archipelago.

Cape Verde's population is among the healthiest in Africa. Since its independence, it has greatly improved its health indicators. Besides having been promoted to the group of "medium development" countries in 2007, leaving the least developed countries category (becoming the second country to do so), as of 2020 it was the 11th best ranked country in Africa in its Human Development Index.

The total expenditure on health was 7.1% of GDP (2015).

Education 

Although the Cape Verdean educational system is similar to the Portuguese system, over the years the local universities have been increasingly adopting the American educational system; for instance, all ten existing universities in the country offer four-year bachelor's degree programs as opposed to five-year bachelor's degree programs that existed before 2010. Cape Verde has the second best educational system in Africa, after South Africa.
Primary school education in Cape Verde is mandatory and free for children between the ages of six and fourteen years.

In 2011, the net enrolment ratio for primary school was 85%. Approximately 90% of the total population over 15 years of age is literate, and roughly 25% of the population holds a college degree; a significant number of these college graduates hold doctorate degrees in different academic fields. Textbooks have been made available to 90 percent of school children, and 98 percent of the teachers have attended in-service teacher training. Although most children have access to education, some problems remain. For example, there is insufficient spending on school materials, lunches, and books.

, there were 69 secondary schools throughout the archipelago (including 19 private secondary schools) and at least 10 universities in the country, which are based on the two islands of Santiago and São Vicente.

In 2015, 23% of the Cape Verdean population had either attended or graduated from secondary schools.
When it came to higher education, 9% of Cape Verdean men and 8% of Cape Verdean women held a bachelor's degree or had attended universities. The overall college education rate (i.e., college graduates and undergraduate students) in Cape Verde is about 24%, of the local college-age population.
The total expenditure on education was 5.6% of GDP (2010).
The mean years of schooling of adults over 25 years is 12.

These trends were held in 2017. Cape Verde stands out in West Africa for the quality and inclusiveness of its higher education system. As of 2017, one in four young people attended university and one-third of students opted for fields of science, technology, engineering, and mathematics. Women made up one-third of students but two-thirds of graduates in 2018.

Science and technology 

In 2011, Cape Verde devoted just 0.07% of its GDP to research and development, among the lowest rates in West Africa. The Ministry of Higher Education, Science and Culture plan to strengthen the research and academic sectors by emphasizing greater mobility, through exchange programmes and international cooperation agreements. As part of this strategy, Cape Verde is participating in the Ibero-American academic mobility programme that expects to mobilize 200,000 academics between 2015 and 2020. Cape Verde was ranked 89th in the Global Innovation Index in 2021.

Cape Verde counted 25 researchers in 2011, a researcher density of 51 per million inhabitants. The world average was 1,083 per million in 2013. All 25 researchers were working in the government sector in 2011 and one in three were women (36%). There was no research being conducted in either medical or agricultural sciences. Of the eight engineers involved in research and development, one was a woman. Three of the five researchers working in natural sciences were women, as were three of the six social scientists and two of the five researchers from the humanities.

In 2015, the government announced a project to build a technology park for business, research, and development. As of late 2020, the project, now named TechPark Cabo Verde, is slated for completion in June 2022. The project is funded by both the African Development Bank and the government of Cape Verde. The goal of the endeavour, according to Cape Verde Minister of Finance Olavo Correia, is "to attract large international companies to set up shop [in order] to help local companies and start-ups become more competitive".

Crime 

Theft and burglary are common in Cape Verde, especially in crowded environments such as marketplaces, festivals, and celebrations. Often the perpetrators of these crimes are gangs of street children. Murders are concentrated in the major population centres of Praia and Mindelo.

Culture 

The culture of Cape Verde is characterized by a mixture of African and European elements. This is not a sum of two cultures living side by side, but a new culture resulting from an exchange that began in the 15th century.

Cape Verdean social and cultural patterns are unique. Football games and church activities are typical sources of social interaction and entertainment.

Media 

In towns with electricity, television is available on three channels; one state-owned (RTC – TCV) and three foreign-owned: RTI Cabo Verde launched by the Portuguese-based RTI in 2005; Record Cabo Verde, launched by the Brazilian-based Rede Record on 31 March 2007; and as of 2016, TV CPLP. Premium channels available include the Cape Verdean versions of Boom TV and Zap Cabo Verde, two channels owned by Brazil's Record. Other premium channels are available in Cape Verde, especially satellite network channels which are common in hotels and villas, though availability is otherwise limited. One such channel is RDP África, the African version of the Portuguese radio station RDP.

As of early 2023, about 99% of the Cape Verdean population own an active cellular phone, 70% have access to the Internet, 11% own a landline telephone, and 2% subscribe to local cable TV. In 2003, Cape Verde had 71,700 main line telephones with an additional 53,300 cellular phones in use throughout the country.

In 2004, there were seven radio stations, six independent and one state-owned. The media is operated by the Cape-Verdean News Agency (secondarily as Inforpress). Nationwide radio stations include RCV, RCV+, Radio Kriola, and the religious station Radio Nova. Local radio stations include Rádio Praia, the first radio station in Cape Verde; Praia FM, the first FM station in the nation; Rádio Barlavento, Rádio Clube do Mindelo and Radio Morabeza in Mindelo.

Music 

The Cape Verdean people are known for their musicality, well expressed by popular manifestations such as the Carnival of Mindelo. Cape Verde music incorporates "African, Portuguese and Brazilian influences." Cape Verde's quintessential national music is the morna, a melancholy and lyrical song form typically sung in Cape Verdean Creole. The most popular music genre after morna is the coladeira, followed by funaná and batuque music. Cesária Évora was the best-known Cape Verdean singer in the world, known as the "barefoot diva," because she liked to perform barefooted on stage. She was also referred to as "The Queen of Morna" as opposed to her uncle Bana, who was referred to as "King of Morna". The international success of Cesária Évora has made other Cape Verdean artists, or descendants of Cape Verdeans born in Portugal, gain more space in the music market. Examples of this are singers Sara Tavares, Lura and Mayra Andrade.

Another great exponent of traditional music from Cape Verde was Antonio Vicente Lopes, better known as Travadinha, and Ildo Lobo, who died in 2004. The House of Culture in the center of the city of Praia is called Ildo Lobo House of Culture, in his honour.

There are also well-known artists born to Cape Verdean parents who excelled themselves in the international music scene. Amongst these artists are jazz pianist Horace Silver, Duke Ellington's saxophonist Paul Gonsalves, Teófilo Chantre, Paul Pena, the Tavares brothers and singer Lura.

Dance 
Dance forms include the soft dance morna, the coladeira, the Cape Verdean version of the zouk from Guadeloupe called Cabo love, the funaná (a sensual African dance), the batuque dance, and the Cabo Zouk.

Literature 

Cape Verdean literature is one of the richest of Lusophone Africa. Famous poets include Paulino Vieira, Manuel de Novas, Sergio Frusoni, Eugénio Tavares, and B. Léza, and famous authors include Baltasar Lopes da Silva, António Aurélio Gonçalves, Manuel Lopes, Orlanda Amarílis, Henrique Teixeira de Sousa, Arménio Vieira, Kaoberdiano Dambará, Dr. Azágua, and Germano Almeida. The first novel written by a woman from Cabo Verde was A Louca de Serrano by Dina Salústio; its translation, as The Madwoman of Serrano, was the first translation of any Cabo Verdean novel to English.

Cinema 
The Carnival and the island of São Vicente are portrayed in the 2015 feature documentary Tchindas, nominated at the 12th Africa Movie Academy Awards.

Cuisine 

The Cape Verde diet is mostly based on fish and staple foods like corn and rice. Vegetables available during most of the year are potatoes, onions, tomatoes, manioc, cabbage, kale, and dried beans. Fruits such as bananas and papayas are available year-round, while others like mangoes and avocados are seasonal.

A popular dish served in Cape Verde is cachupa, a slow-cooked stew of corn (hominy), beans, and fish or meat. A common appetizer is the pastel, a pastry shell filled with fish or meat which is then fried.

Sports 

The country's most successful sports team is the Cape Verde national basketball team, which won the bronze medal at the FIBA Africa Championship 2007, after beating Egypt in its last game. The country's most well-known player is Walter Tavares, who plays for Real Madrid of Spain.

Cape Verde is famous for wave sailing (a type of windsurfing) and kiteboarding. Josh Angulo, a Hawaiian and 2009 PWA Wave World Champion, has done much to promote the archipelago as a windsurfing destination. Mitu Monteiro, a local kitesurfer, was the 2008 Kite Surfing World Champion in the wave discipline.

The team has played at three Africa Cup of Nations, in 2013, 2015, and 2021.

The country has competed at every Summer Olympics since 1996. In 2016, Gracelino Barbosa became the first Cape Verdean to win a medal at the Paralympic Games.

Transport

Ports 

There are four international ports: Mindelo, Praia, Palmeira and Sal Rei. Mindelo on São Vicente is the main port for cruise ships and the terminus for the ferry service to Santo Antão. Praia on Santiago is the main hub for local ferry services to other islands. Palmeira on Sal supplies fuel for the main airport on the island, Amílcar Cabral International Airport, and is important for the hotel construction taking place on the island. Porto Novo on Santo Antão is the only source for imports and exports of produce from the island as well as passenger traffic since the closure of the airstrip at Ponta do Sol.

There are smaller harbours, essentially single jetties at Tarrafal on São Nicolau, Sal Rei on Boa Vista, Vila do Maio (Porto Inglês) on Maio, São Filipe on Fogo and Furna on Brava. These act as terminals for the inter-island ferry services, which carry both freight and passengers. The pier at Santa Maria on Sal used by both fishing and dive boats has been rehabilitated.

Airports 

There were seven operational airports  – four international and three domestic. Two others were non-operational, one on Brava and the other on Santo Antão closed for safety reasons.

Due to its geographical location, Cape Verde is often flown over by transatlantic airliners. It is part of the conventional air traffic route from Europe to South America, which goes from southern Portugal via the Canary Islands and Cape Verde to northern Brazil.

International airports 
 Amílcar Cabral International Airport, Sal Island
 Nelson Mandela International Airport, Santiago Island
 Aristides Pereira International Airport, Boa Vista Island
 Cesária Évora Airport, São Vicente Island

Aerial drones
Small unmanned flying drones able to carry up to 5kg were being used experimentally for tasks such as delivering medicines between the islands in 2021.

See also 

 Outline of Cape Verde
 Index of Cape Verde–related articles
 Islands of Macaronesia
 Azores
 Madeira

References

Bibliography

External links 

 
 Official website of the Government of Cape Verde
 
 Cape Verde. The World Factbook. Central Intelligence Agency.
 Cape Verde from State.gov
 Country Profile from BBC News
 Cape Verde entry on Encyclopædia Britannica
 Cape Verde from UCB Libraries GovPubs
 Key Development Forecasts for Cape Verde from International Futures
 Cape Verde 2016

 
Macaronesia
West African countries
Economic Community of West African States
Island countries
Islands of Macaronesia
Portuguese-speaking countries and territories
Republics
States and territories established in 1975
Member states of the African Union
Member states of the Community of Portuguese Language Countries
Member states of the Organisation internationale de la Francophonie
Member states of the United Nations
Small Island Developing States
1975 establishments in Africa

Countries in Africa
Former least developed countries
Tropical Atlantic
Marine ecoregions